Richard (Dick) Neil McClure (born January 20, 1935) is a Canadian rower who competed in the 1956 Summer Olympics and the 1958 Commonwealth Games.

In 1956 he was a crew member of the Canadian boat which won the silver medal in the eights event. In 1958 he got a silver medal in the coxless fours.

Education
McClure graduated from UBC with a Mechanical Engineering degree in 1959.

References

External links
 profile
 

1935 births
Living people
Canadian male rowers
Olympic rowers of Canada
Rowers at the 1956 Summer Olympics
Olympic silver medalists for Canada
Rowers at the 1958 British Empire and Commonwealth Games
Commonwealth Games silver medallists for Canada
Olympic medalists in rowing
Medalists at the 1956 Summer Olympics
Commonwealth Games medallists in rowing
University of British Columbia alumni
Medallists at the 1958 British Empire and Commonwealth Games